The '''Men's 100 metres T12''' event at the 2016 Paralympic Games took place on 14–15 September 2016, at the Estádio Olímpico João Havelange.

Heats

Heat 1 
12:13 14 September 2016:

Heat 2 
12:20 14 September 2016:

Heat 3 
12:27 14 September 2016:

Final 
18:10 15 September 2016:

Notes

Athletics at the 2016 Summer Paralympics
2016 in men's athletics